Sasha Marsden was a 16-year-old student studying childcare from Blackpool, England, who was stabbed to death on 31 January 2013. Her body was then set on fire. It was alleged by the media that she had received threatening emails prior to the murder. The murder received international coverage.

Marsden was studying childcare at a local college. She lived with her parents in Staining near Blackpool. Six months earlier, she had been missing for six days before being found in Lowestoft, Suffolk.

On the day of her murder, Marsden had been dropped off at the Grafton House Hotel, believing she was there for a job interview. Her body was found in an alleyway off South Shore and a post-mortem examination revealed attempts to set fire to it. She had been sexually assaulted, stabbed 58 times and her body wrapped in carpet underlay and bin liners.

A 22-year-old man and a 20-year-old woman from the local area were arrested on suspicion of murder the day after it was found.

On 3 February 2013 David Minto, the caretaker of a local hotel, was charged with Marsden's murder while the woman was released without charge. Minto appeared in court the following day. He pleaded not guilty on 24 April 2013. He was remanded in custody to stand trial on 15 July 2013. On 26 July Minto was found guilty of Marsden's murder and was sentenced to life imprisonment with a minimum time of 35 years to serve before being eligible for parole.

Minto appealed against his sentence in February 2014, but it was upheld by the Court of Appeal of England and Wales and the minimum term of 35 years was upheld.

Marsden's sister Gemma Aitchison now campaigns to help sexual assault victims and to change community attitudes, especially amongst young people.

References

2010s in Lancashire
2013 in England
2013 murders in the United Kingdom
Female murder victims
History of Blackpool
January 2013 crimes in Europe
Murder of Sasha Marsden
Murder in Lancashire